Dicing tape is a backing tape used during wafer dicing or some other microelectronic substrate separation, the cutting apart of pieces of semiconductor or other material following wafer or module microfabrication. The tape holds the pieces of the substrate, in case of a wafer called as die, together during the cutting process, mounting them to a thin metal frame. The dies/substrate pieces are removed from the dicing tape later on in the electronics manufacturing process.

Tape types
Dicing tape can be made of PVC, polyolefin, or polyethylene backing material with an adhesive to hold the wafer or substrate in place. In some cases dicing tape will have a release liner that will be removed prior to mounting the tape to the backside of the wafers, with a variety of adhesive strengths, designed for various wafer/substrate sizes and materials.
 UV tapes are dicing tapes in which the adhesive bond is broken by exposure to UV light after dicing, allowing the adhesive to be stronger during cutting while still allowing clean and easy removal. Semiconductor Tapes and Materials. UV equipment can range from low power (a few mW/cm2) to high power (more than 200 mW/cm2). Higher power results in a more complete cure, lower adhesion and reduced adhesive residue, while lower power is safer.
 Thermal release tapes (typically PET material) have been developed for specific cases when etching or material printing is needed after the tape is installed. These tapes can also handle heavy substrates such as ceramic substrates or printed circuit boards (PCBs/PWBs) if needed. Their adhesion disappears when heat (typically ) is applied.

References

External links
 How to mount a dicing tape

Semiconductor device fabrication